Igalula is an administrative ward in Uvinza District of Kigoma Region in Tanzania. 
In 2016 the Tanzania National Bureau of Statistics report there were 26,272 people in the ward, from 23,868 in 2012.

References

Wards of Kigoma Region